The Tragic Treasury: Songs from A Series of Unfortunate Events is the second and most recent studio album by indie pop band The Gothic Archies. It is a concept album whose songs are inspired by the thirteen books of Daniel Handler's book series A Series of Unfortunate Events and were originally included at the end of the audiobook editions of each novel.

The music, like the writing in the books themselves, is morose for comic effect. Some of the songs' lyrics have something to do with the story itself and are often implicitly written in the voice of one of the corresponding book's characters; for example, "When You Play the Violin" is apparently in the voice of one of the book's five orphans, most likely Klaus, while "Dreary, Dreary" appears to be an ode to Beatrice, Lemony Snicket's ill-fated love interest. Others' connections seem to be in name only; for example, "Shipwrecked", The Ends song, is about a man who decapitates his ship's crew in an attempt to be shipwrecked on an island with his true love, only to discover that there is no island anywhere nearby.

The album has 13 tracks, each one corresponding to the respective book of the series, plus two bonus tracks: "Walking My Gargoyle" (the theme originally intended to be from The Carnivorous Carnival) and "We Are the Gothic Archies".

Track listing

Personnel
The Gothic Archies
Stephin Merritt

Additional personnel
Lemony Snicket (aka Daniel Handler) – accordion
John Woo – electric sitar

See also
A Series of Unfortunate Events
Lemony Snicket

References

External links
The Tragic Treasury at Nonesuch Records
The Tragic Treasury at LemonySnicket.com
"Smile! No One Cares How You Feel" as performed live on WAGA's morning TV news show.
Interview between Stephin Merritt and Lemony Snicket, discussing the album.

2006 albums
Concept albums
Music based on novels
Nonesuch Records albums
Daniel Handler
Works by Lemony Snicket
The Gothic Archies albums